The Video Pinball brand is a series of first-generation single-player dedicated home video game consoles manufactured, released and marketed by Atari, Inc. starting in 1977. Bumper controllers on the sides or a dial on the front are used to control the games depending on the game selected. There are three game types in the first model of the Video Pinball series: Pinball, Basketball, and Breakout.

The first model is based on the single chip 011500-11/C011512-05 ("Pong-on-a-chip") produced by Atari.

Gameplay
Video Pinball allows 7 games—4 pinball variations, a basketball game, and two versions of Breakout (Breakout and a variant called Break Away) -- for one to two players. The unit provides digital on-screen scoring, automatic serves, and color graphics. Video Pinball uses a micro-controller and a small amount of RAM rather than the "Pong on a chip" IC's that had been used in the slew of pong machines Atari Inc. had been releasing. Pinball was played primarily with the side bumper buttons, and Breakout and Basketball with the dial and top buttons.

Models
There were three different models of Video Pinball released over its lifetime.  Atari released both woodgrain and cream colored versions as "Atari Video Pinball". An OEM version whose name was changed to "Pinball Breakaway" was also produced by Sears under the Sears' Tele-Games label.

Arcade
An arcade video game version, called Video Pinball, was released by Atari in February 1979. It sold a total of 1,505 arcade cabinets.

References

External links
 Atari Video Pinball (Model C-380) at old-computers.com

Dedicated consoles
First-generation video game consoles
Home video game consoles
Products introduced in 1977
Video games developed in the United States
1970s toys
1977 in video gaming